In mathematics, a locally finite measure is a measure for which every point of the measure space has a neighbourhood of finite measure.

Definition

In more condensed notation,  is locally finite if and only if

Examples

Similarly, any measure that assigns finite measure to the whole space is locally finite.
 Lebesgue measure on Euclidean space is locally finite.
 By definition, any Radon measure is locally finite.
 The counting measure is sometimes locally finite and sometimes not: the counting measure on the integers with their usual discrete topology is locally finite, but the counting measure on the real line with its usual Borel topology is not.

See also

References

Measures (measure theory)